Indie Hoy is an Argentine online publication launched in 2008 and based in Buenos Aires. It publishes daily reviews, news and interviews that mainly focuses on music, also including other forms of popular culture.

History
Indie Hoy was launched in 2008 and is based in Buenos Aires, Argentina. The site has been considered a "benchmark of the Argentine independent scene". In October 2018—in celebration of the ten years since its launch—Indie Hoy organized a music festival at Fundación Konex's venue Ciudad Cultural Konex, with a line-up made up of Louta, Peces Raros, Gativideo, Marina Fages, El Príncipe Idiota, and Tani and Lucia Tachetti.

In 2019, Indie Hoy was a member of the Epica Awards jury.

See also
 Argentine rock
 List of magazines in Argentina
 List of music magazines
 List of online magazines

References

External links
  (in Spanish)

2008 establishments in Argentina
Magazines published in Buenos Aires
Magazines established in 2008
Online music magazines
Spanish-language magazines